Wendell K Jones is an American politician. He is a member of the South Carolina House of Representatives from the 25th District. Jones is a member of the Democratic party. He ran to fill the seat of Democratic incumbent Leola C. Robinson-Simpson, who served since 2013 and chose not to run for re-election in 2022. Jones won the District 25 seat over two opponents in the 2022 general election after defeating opponents in the June primary. His primary runoff with Derrick Quarels was briefly halted while the Court considered a challenge to Quarels being on the ballot.

Jones serves of the House Legislative Oversight and the Medical, Military, Public and Municipal Affairs Committees.

References

Democratic Party members of the South Carolina House of Representatives
Living people
21st-century American politicians
21st-century African-American politicians
African-American state legislators in South Carolina
Year of birth missing (living people)